A university consortium in Finland is an educational institution managed by the Ministry of Education, coordinating university-level higher education in localities where there are no universities. There are six such consortiums set up since 2004, in Kajaani, Kokkola, Lahti, Mikkeli, Pori, and Seinäjoki. These consortiums typically work with one or more universities to provide education at their host localities.

List of university consortiums 

 Kajaanin yliopistokeskus
 Kokkolan yliopistokeskus
 Lahden yliopistokeskus
 Mikkelin yliopistokeskus
 University Consortium of Pori
 Seinäjoen yliopistokeskus

References

Finland
Consortium